Teretia monterosatoi is an extinct species of sea snail, a marine gastropod mollusk in the family Raphitomidae.

Distribution
Fossils of this marine species were found in Pliocene strata off Palermo, Italy; also in Pliocene strata at the Alpes-Maritimes, France.

References

 Cipolla, F. (1914) Le Pleurotomidi del Pliocene di Altavilla (Palermo). Palaeontographia Italica, 20, 105–181, pls. 1(12)–3(14) page(s): 160, pl. 14 fig. 6 a-b 
 Brunetti, M.; Vecchi, G. (2003). Sul ritrovamento di Teretia elengatissima (Foresti, 1868) in terreni pliocenici dell'Emilia e della Toscana. Bollettino della Società Paleontologica Italiana. 42: 49–57.
 Chirli (C.) & Richard (C.), 2008 Les Mollusques plaisanciens de la Côte d’Azur, p. 1-128

External links
 Morassi M. & Bonfitto A. (2015). New Indo-Pacific species of the genus Teretia Norman, 1888 (Gastropoda: Raphitomidae). Zootaxa. 3911(4): 560-570 
 

monterosatoi
Gastropods described in 1914